Zaire (now called the Democratic Republic of the Congo) competed at the 1983 World Championships in Athletics in Helsinki, Finland, from August 7 to 14, 1983.

Men 
Track and road events

Women 
Track and road events

References

Nations at the 1983 World Championships in Athletics
World Championships in Athletics
Democratic Republic of the Congo at the World Championships in Athletics